Tropicália ou Panis et Circencis (misspelled Latin for Bread and circuses) is a 1968 collaboration album by artists including Gilberto Gil, Caetano Veloso, Tom Zé, Os Mutantes and Gal Costa. Considered an important record in the Tropicália movement and in the history of Brazilian music, it features orchestral arrangements by Rogerio Duprat and lyrical contributions from Torquato Neto.

Cover
The main contributors can be seen on the album cover, which is intended to be a tribute to influential Beatles album Sgt. Pepper's Lonely Hearts Club Band. Seated on the floor, Gilberto Gil holds the graduation photo of Capinan. To the left, holding a chamber pot, is Rogério Duprat. To the right, Gal Costa, wearing a yellow dress, is beside Torquato Neto, with a cap. Caetano Veloso is to the left of them, holding a picture of Nara Leão. Behind them are Tom Zé, on the right, and Os Mutantes, on the left (more precisely, from left to right, Arnaldo Baptista, Rita Lee and Sérgio Dias).

Influence
It is considered to be the manifesto of the Tropicalismo movement.  It is number 2 on Rolling Stone's list of 100 greatest Brazilian albums of all time. The song "Baby" and the title track were voted by the Brazilian edition of Rolling Stone, respectively, as the 30th and the 7th greatest Brazilian song. In September 2012, it was elected by the audience of Radio Eldorado FM, of Estadao.com e of Caderno C2+Música (both the latter belong to newspaper O Estado de S. Paulo) as the ninth best Brazilian album ever. At the time of the album's release, the newspaper also considered it one of the best albums released that year in Brazil."

Track listing

Personnel

 Rogério Duprat: arrangement and conducting

References 

1968 compilation albums
Universal Music Group compilation albums
Portuguese-language compilation albums
Albums arranged by Rogério Duprat
Albums conducted by Rogério Duprat
Tropicália compilation albums